{{Taxobox
| name = Marcusenius sp. nov. 'Turkwell| image = 
| status = VU | status_system = IUCN3.1
| regnum = Animalia
| phylum = Chordata
| classis = Actinopterygii
| ordo = Osteoglossiformes
| familia = Mormyridae
| genus = Marcusenius
| species = M. sp. nov. 'Turkwell'| binomial = Marcusenius sp. nov. 'Turkwell| binomial_authority = 
| synonyms = 
}}Marcusenius sp. nov. 'Turkwell' is a species of fish in the family Mormyridae. It is endemic to Kenya.  Its natural habitat is rivers.

Sources 

Marcusenius
Endemic freshwater fish of Kenya
Undescribed vertebrate species
Taxonomy articles created by Polbot
Taxobox binomials not recognized by IUCN